The Provincial Highways of Sindh consists of all public highways maintained by Sindh province, Pakistan. These are not to be confused with national highways which are federal roads maintained by the Government of Pakistan and the National Highway Authority.

List of Provincial Highways

See also
 Motorways of Pakistan
 National Highways of Pakistan
 Transport in Pakistan
 National Highway Authority

References

External links 
 Sindh Road Map
 Sindh Works & Services Department

Highways in Sindh